Gilbert Classical Academy (GCA) is a choice 7th-12th junior high and high school in the Gilbert Public Schools district. It opened in 2007, replacing the former Tech and Leadership Academy in that district which served 9th–12th grades.

Students a follow a strict dress code. Uniform options for bottoms include khaki shorts, pants, and skorts and purple and yellow plaid skirts and skorts. Polos can be white, purple, or yellow. Seniors are permitted to wear black polos or dress shirts. On Fridays, seniors and teachers are encouraged to wear college shirts.

Students in grades 9 through 12 are able to participate in some Arizona Interscholastic Association-sanctioned sports. Gilbert Classical Academy had its first graduating class in 2011. In 2017 the school created a program for Special Ed students.

In 2017, the school took over the campus of the Gilbert Jr High School.

This school has been ranked third in the state and tenth in the nation.

In 2018, the school was awarded the honor of being a Blue Ribbon School.

Curriculum and Traditions 
Courses at Gilbert Classical Academy employ the Socratic method of instruction, and all courses are entirely honors or Advanced Placement courses. All junior high students are required to learn Latin.

Each student has the option to receive a district-issued Chromebook or laptop computer that facilitates the integration of technology into the curriculum. District-issued computers are monitored and used to issue standardized testing.

Students are required to perform 80 hours of community service and must write and defend a 4,000 word Senior Thesis Project as a graduation requirement.

GCA employs some 30 faculty members (including 23 teachers). The school was created by its founding principal, Mr. Brian Rosta.

References

External links
 

Education in Gilbert, Arizona
Educational institutions established in 2007
Public high schools in Arizona
Schools in Maricopa County, Arizona
Public middle schools in Arizona
2007 establishments in Arizona